Dakers Island is an island between Hartshorne Island and McGuire Island in the eastern Joubin Islands. It was named by the Advisory Committee on Antarctic Names for Hugh B. Dakers, a cook in RV Hero on her first Antarctic voyage to Palmer Station in 1968.

See also 
 List of Antarctic and sub-Antarctic islands

References

 

Islands of the Palmer Archipelago